Samurai Pizza Cats was originally made in Japan by Tatsunoko Pro. as Kyatto Ninden Teyandee. 54 episodes aired from 1 February 1990 to 12 February 1991 on TV Tokyo.

52 episodes were dubbed into English and introduced to the western audience by Saban as Samurai Pizza Cats. Saban did not receive good English translations for the episodes, so the company opted to edit the video and create new stories and dialog. There are significant plot differences between many of the Japanese and English episodes. This list has the English episode descriptions.

Episode list

References

Samurai Pizza Cats